Broadhurst is a surname. Notable people with the surname include:

born in Australia
Blake Broadhurst (born 1985), Australian rules footballer
Edward Broadhurst, English-born Australian barrister and politician
Florance Broadhurst (1861–1909), Australian businessman
Florence Broadhurst (1899–1977), Australian designer and businesswoman whose murder remains unsolved

born in Canada
Cecil Broadhurst (1903–1981), Canadian-American artist

born in Ireland
Amy Broadhurst (born 1997), Irish amateur boxer

born in New Zealand
James Broadhurst (born 1987), New Zealand rugby union player
Mark Broadhurst (born c. 1956), New Zealand rugby league player
Michael Broadhurst (born 1986), New Zealand rugby union player
Phil Broadhurst (1949–2020), New Zealand composer and jazz pianist

born in the United Kingdom
Bob Broadhurst, British police commander
Brian Broadhurst, English footballer
Charles Broadhurst, English footballer
Charles Edward Broadhurst (1861–1909), English-Australian pioneer
Don Broadhurst (born 1984), English boxer
Sir Edward Tootal Broadhurst, 1st Baronet (1858–1922), British businessman
Fred Broadhurst (1888–1953), English footballer
George Broadhurst (1866–1952), English-American theatre manager and playwright
Sir Harry Broadhurst (1905–1995), commander in the Royal Air Force
Henry Broadhurst (1840–1911), British trade unionist and politician
John Broadhurst (1778–1861), British politician
Rt Revd Dr John Broadhurst (living), Bishop of Fulham in the Diocese of London, England
Joanne Broadhurst (born 1967), English footballer
Joe Broadhurst (born 1862), English footballer
Karl Broadhurst (born 1980), English footballer
Kevan Broadhurst (born 1959), English footballer and football manager
Mark Broadhurst (born 1974), English cricketer
Mary Broadhurst (1860–1928), English suffragette 
Paul Broadhurst (born 1965), English golfer
Penny Broadhurst (born 1980), British singer-songwriter
Ronald Broadhurst (1906–1976), Northern Irish politician
Susan Broadhurst, artist and academic

born in the United States
Al Broadhurst (1927–2014), American speed skater
Alex Broadhurst (born 1993), American ice hockey player
Arthur Broadhurst (born 1964), American politician
Jean Broadhurst (1873–1954), American scientist
Kent Broadhurst (born 1940), American actor
Max Broadhurst (1896–?), American football player
Terry Broadhurst (born 1988), American ice hockey player